Anime from Akira to Princess Mononoke: Experiencing Contemporary Japanese Animation is a scholarly book which uses techniques of literary criticism on anime by Susan J. Napier published in 2001 by Palgrave Macmillan. It discusses themes of shōjo, hentai, mecha, magical girlfriend and magical girl anime using select titles. It also discusses some aspects of the English-speaking anime fandom. The book has been translated into Japanese, and had four editions, before a revised fifth edition was published in 2005 as Anime from Akira to Howl's Moving Castle: Experiencing Contemporary Japanese Animation.

Contents
The book uses literary criticism to discuss themes and ideas present in select anime titles and attempts to categorise anime into three types - apocalyptic, festival, and elegiac. 
The book is split into five sections. In the first, Napier asks why anime is important as a topic of study. In the second, Napier looks at the representation of the human body in anime, looking at "monstrous adolescents", pornographic anime and cyborgs. In the third, Napier looks at representations of females, the girl, the magical girl and magical girlfriends. In the fourth section, Napier examines historical-themed anime.

The "monstrous adolescent" is often a quick-tempered or psychologically disturbed child with remarkable and world-changing powers, which were usually a result of scientific experiments, revolutionary technology, or human-caused pollution. These children have the power to improve or alter the world, but because of their personality the child is often on the verge of destroying it completely. The source of this create/destroy idea is usually traced back to the effects of Hiroshima and the capabilities of nuclear power and atomic bombs. The theme of the "monstrous adolescent" explores  society's fears of ever-growing technology, the rebellious actions of children, and the apocalyptic scenarios that are suggested by combining these two themes.

Titles discussed at length in the book include Akira, Ranma ½, Wicked City, Twin Dolls, La Blue Girl, Guyver: Out of Control, Bubblegum Crisis, Neon Genesis Evangelion, Ghost in the Shell, My Neighbor Totoro, Kiki's Delivery Service, Nausicaä of the Valley of the Wind, Urusei Yatsura, Oh My Goddess!, Video Girl Ai, Grave of the Fireflies, Barefoot Gen, Princess Mononoke, Legend of the Overfiend, Only Yesterday, the "Magnetic Rose" sequence in Memories, and Urusei Yatsura 2: Beautiful Dreamer.

Other anime mentioned include Speed Racer, Doraemon, Pokémon, Sailor Moon, Perfect Blue, Heidi, Girl of the Alps, Tenchi Muyo!, Astro Boy, Kimba the White Lion, Space Battleship Yamato, Pom Poko, Saber Marionette, Whisper of the Heart, Cutie Honey, Vampire Princess Miyu, Miss Machiko, Iron Man No. 28, Gundam, Super Dimension Century Orguss, Future Boy Conan, Castle in the Sky, Porco Rosso, Rurouni Kenshin, Ninja Scroll, Appleseed, and Grey.

Reception
The book has been criticised for its scholarly nature and "dryness", as well as the limited choice of titles presented.  Napier also does not include discussion of the anime industry.  It was praised for not trying to make there be just one reading of all anime.  It was criticised for not examining the graphical stylistic conventions of anime and for failing to address the issue of 'Japanese patriarchy'.  It has been noted that Napier focusses on the narrative qualities of anime, covering ideas, images and themes presented, but that as of 2006, the book is still current and timely, and has an accurate tone when it discusses the anime fandom.  The clear language of the book has been praised.

There are some factual errors in the book when describing plot summaries and descriptions of series.  The book does not engage with the history of anime, or attempt to discern why anime is a distinct medium, or discuss the hallmarks of different formats of anime, such as TV series as opposed to OVAs or animated movies.

The book has been described as "a great textbook for undergraduates" and is used as a course text by university subjects which focus on East Asian cinema, examining Japanese cyberpunk, examining the supernatural in Japanese fiction, depictions of the apocalypse in Asian cinema, gender studies in East Asia and courses on animation itself.

In 2020, Ohio lawmakers Reggie Stoltzfus and Don Jones called for Kent State University to withdraw the book from the university, arguing the book contained adult material not suitable for minors attending the university. Napier responded by saying: "It was shocking to me they would want to have the book banned and use terms like "pornographic" about the book. The idea of feeling that if you don't like a subject you ignore or suppress anything controversial is not a very sensible way to approach a subject. It can come back and flower even more because it's seen as forbidden."

References

External links
Anime from Akira to Howl's Moving Castle at the Palgrave Macmillan website.

2001 non-fiction books
2005 non-fiction books
Books about anime
Palgrave Macmillan books